Nicolás Ramón Mancilla Hidalgo (born 7 October 1993) is a Chilean footballer. His current club is Ñublense.

References

External links
 
 
 

1993 births
Living people
Footballers from Santiago
Chilean footballers
Association football defenders
Unión Española footballers
Deportes Iberia footballers
Rangers de Talca footballers
Ñublense footballers
Chilean Primera División players
Segunda División Profesional de Chile players
Primera B de Chile players